Zangiabad (also Romanized as Zangīābād) is a village in Naqsh-e Rostam Rural District, in the Central District of Marvdasht County, Fars Province, Iran. At the 2006 census, its population was 3,588, in 840 families.

References 

Populated places in Marvdasht County